Ross Johnson (born 22 July 1951) is a former Australian rules footballer who played with Hawthorn in the Victorian Football League (VFL).

References

External links

1951 births
Living people
Australian rules footballers from Victoria (Australia)
Hawthorn Football Club players